Eight Immortals from Sichuan are eight Sichuanese who supposedly became  xian ("immortals; transcendents; fairies"). The term is first used by Qiao Xiu (譙秀 qiáo xiù) in Record of Shu (《蜀紀》 shǔ zì) written in Jin Dynasty.

They are:

 Fan Changsheng (范长生 Fàn Chángshēng),
 Dong Zhongshu (董仲舒 Dǒng Zhòngshū), 
 Li Babai (李八百 Lǐ Bābǎi), 
 Li Er (李耳 Lǐ Ěr), 
 Master Erzhu (尔朱先生 Ěrzhū Xiānshēng),
 Rong Chenggong (容成公 Róng Chénggōng), 
 Zhang Daoling (张道陵 Zhāng Dàolīng), and
 Yan Junping (严君平 Yán Jūnpíng).

8 Eight Immortals from Sichuan
Articles about multiple people in pre-Tang China
Octets